The Los Bronces mine is a large copper mine located in central Chile, on the border of the Santiago Metropolitan Region and the Valparaíso Region with a height above sea level from 3000 to 4200 its approximate limit. Los Bronces represents one of the largest copper reserves in Chile and in the world having estimated reserves of 3.13 billion tonnes of ore grading 0.32% copper.

Mineralization at Los Bronces is thought to be due to its position at the intersection of two large fault systems. This favoured the rise of magma and the subsequent circulation of mineral-rich fluids.

In Los Bronces, formerly known as Disputada de Las Condes, a mining folklore tells of man known as "El Futre" (lit. "The Snob"). El Futre is said to be a formally dressed man who appear in drifts murdering or scaring workers in order to steal their salary.

References 

Copper mines in Chile
Mines in Valparaíso Region
Mines in Santiago Metropolitan Region